Let's Go Scare Al was the first album recorded by the Austin, Minnesota band the Gear Daddies. The album was released in 1988 on the Gark record label, and re-released in 1990 on Polygram Records.

Track listing
 Cut Me Off 
  Statue of Jesus 
  Boys Will Be Boys 
  Don't Forget Me 
  Heavy Metal Böyz 
  Drank So Much (Just Feel Stupid) 
  She's Happy 
  Blues Mary 
  This Time 
  Strength

Personnel
Randy Broughten: guitar pedal steel guitar, dobro.
Nick Ciola: bass.
Billy Dankert: drums, piano, vocals.
Martin Zellar: guitar, harmonica, vocals.

References

1988 albums
Gear Daddies albums
PolyGram albums